Theodoros Ziakas is a municipal unit of the Grevena municipality. Before the 2011 local government reform it was an independent municipality. The 2011 census recorded 1,297 residents in the municipal unit. Theodoros Ziakas covers an area of 241.768 km2. The seat of the municipality was in Mavranaioi.

Name
It was named after Theodoros Ziakas, a 19th-century leader of the Greek struggle for independence.

See also
 List of settlements in the Grevena regional unit

References

Populated places in Grevena (regional unit)
Former municipalities in Western Macedonia